Roberto René Azurdia Paiz (born 1926) is a Guatemalan writer, diplomat and physician.

Career

Azurdia was appointed minister of public health by the president of Guatemala, in 1961 and served in that function until his nomination as ambassador to Italy in 1963 during the presidencies of Enrique Peralta Azurdia and Julio César Méndez.

Ambassador in Italy
While acting as Ambassador to Italy, he served as representative from Guatemala to the Food and Agriculture Organization of the United Nations.

References

1926 births
Possibly living people
Guatemalan diplomats
Guatemalan male writers
Guatemalan novelists
Male novelists
Guatemalan surgeons
Guatemalan physicians
Guatemalan navy personnel
Health ministers of Guatemala
Ambassadors of Guatemala to Italy
Representatives of Guatemala to the Food and Agriculture Organization